Janne Heikkinen may refer to:

 Janne Heikkinen (volleyball) (born 1976), Finnish volleyball player
 Janne Heikkinen (politician) (born 1990), Finnish politician